Simon Barrow is a practical theologian, commentator, journalist, NGO consultant, adult educator and trainer  who is director of the religion and society think tank Ekklesia.

Simon Barrow is the creator of Employer Brand concept and consultant. Simon Barrow was Chairman and founder of the consultancy People in Business (PiB) which he sold to a private equity owned US group in August 2007. He retired to focus on his new interests in 2012.
The first academic paper on the Employer Brand was written by Tim Ambler, Grand Metropolitan Senior Research Fellow at London Business School and Simon Barrow and was published in 1996 in the Journal of Brand Management. Simon had earlier created the concept of the Employer Brand when his brand management experience with Knorr and later Colgate came face to face with the different challenges of managing a large team. The authors described the concept in these words: <ref>"Simon Barrow Profile".

Notes

External links
"Being Christian in a sceptical climate". 4 February 2009.
https://www.researchgate.net/publication/263326597_The_employer_brand

British Christian theologians
Living people
Year of birth missing (living people)